Woodcraft Folk is a UK-based educational movement for children and young people. Founded in 1925 and grown by volunteers, it has been a registered charity since 1965 and a registered company limited by guarantee since 2012. The constitutional object of this youth organisation is "to educate and empower young people to be able to participate actively in society, improving their lives and others' through active citizenship."

History
The name 'Woodcraft' was used by writer and naturalist Ernest Thompson Seton at the start of the 20th century when setting up the American proto-Scouting organisation Woodcraft Indians, and in this context meant the skill of living in the open air, close to nature. Seton later influenced Robert Baden-Powell and became chief scout of the US.

John Hargrave admired Seton's work and aimed to revert to it and away from Baden-Powell's influence in founding the Kindred of the Kibbo Kift. Another pro-Seton breakaway Scout group was the Order of Woodcraft Chivalry, founded slightly earlier in 1916.

Whilst sharing many of the same historical roots as the Scouting movement, Woodcraft Folk's direct antecedent was the Kindred of the Kibbo Kift, an organisation led by ex-Scout Commissioner for Woodcraft and Camping John Hargrave, who had broken with what he considered to be the Scouts' militaristic approach in the years immediately after the First World War. Woodcraft Folk was established by Leslie Paul in 1925 after the south London co-operative groups challenged Hargrave's authoritarian tendencies over his refusal to recognise a local group called "The Brockley Thing" and broke away from the Kindred.

In its early days it was very similar to the Kibbo Kift, with a strong pagan and anti-capitalist emphasis, but gradually developed its own distinct ethos. In the 1920s and 1930s it had close ties to the Co-operative Societies and to the labour, pacifist, early feminist and trade union movements, which provided a base for recruiting both adults and children and a practical focus which avoided it sharing the fates of the Kibbo Kift and Order of Woodcraft Chivalry, which both became increasingly eccentric and esoteric and were both moribund by the 1950s.

The Woodcraft Folk remained mainly based in working-class districts of industrial towns and cities, notably London, Coventry, and Sheffield, and with strong connections to the Co-operative Societies until the 1960s when it began to acquire a larger middle-class membership. During the 1970s to 1990s there was a large increase in new 'districts' (local branches) being founded in suburbs and small towns, some of which were short-lived.

Recruitment of new members slowed in the 1990s, apparently due to Scout and Cub groups admitting girls, which removed the Woodcraft Folk's former appeal as the only organisation of its kind welcoming children of both sexes.

In the 1990s there was considerable debate within the movement, including over whether to keep or abandon the 'Folk Shirt' (a green overshirt worn with badges) and over the role of camping and other outdoor activities. The Woodcraft Folk had traditionally attached great importance to outdoor activities and to urban children having access to the natural world, but camping has had a more peripheral role in recent years.

In 2000 Woodcraft Folk developed a birthday logo. There was much argument about which logo should be used on official publications, with the new square logo favoured for a long time by the Head Office. In 2008 Annual Conference Woodcraft Folk voted to stop using the 75th logo and resort only to the round logo on official publications.

The history within the labour movement can be seen in the book produced by Woodcraft Folk called Fashioning a New World which it commissioned for its 75th birthday. Other historical references exist, Cooperative Banners a book available from the Rochdale Pioneers museum contains banners of Woodcraft Folk. Woodcraft Folk historical records are held at the University College London. Much of these archives can be viewed on-line including resources on how to use them for young peoples groups.

Philosophy
The Woodcraft Folk has always been "committed to issues of social justice, pacifism and the principles of cooperation" and described itself in 1930 as a "powerful educational instrument". A slogan of Woodcraft Folk is Span the world with friendship, it also uses "Education for Social Change" in its publicity and also constitutional documents.

Woodcraft Folk is not based upon any particular religious belief or national identity. The core values are that irrespective of social background, status, age, gender, sexual orientation etc.  all members have an equal say in the decision making process. The organisation welcomes all young people whether they have a religious background or none and much of its work emphasises the importance of international understanding and friendship. The principles of peace and co-operation are therefore central to everything they do and they endeavour to develop members to have an understanding of some of the issues behind global poverty and conflict in the belief in fashioning a new, better world.

The Creed
Woodcraft Folk's creed is traditionally said at the beginning of any group night or formal meeting. It is also known as the envoy. Each person raises their right hand and says in unison:
This shall be for a bond between us,
That we are of one blood you and I;
That we shall cry peace to all,
And claim kinship with every living thing;
That we hate War, Sloth and Greed,
And love fellowship.
And that we shall go singing to the fashioning of a new world.
PEACE

There is an alternative to this, usually recited in younger groups such as Elfins (6–9). The words to this are as follows:

We will do our best to be healthy and happy,
To care for the world and everything in it.
We will work with our friends in Woodcraft Folk
To build a fair and peaceful world for everyone.
PEACE.

Another alternative used during the 1960s and 70s for the Elfin Creed was:

I will grow strong and straight – like the pine;
Supple of limb – like the hare;
Keen of eye like the eagle;
I will seek health from the greenwood,
Skill from crafts,
And wisdom from those who will show me wisdom.
I will be a worthy comrade in the Green Company,
And a loyal member of the World Family.

Pioneers:
For these things shall I strive;
A keen eye;
A seeing hand;
A body that fails not;
An arm that is strong and willing to serve;
A mind that yearns to understand;
A spirit that searches for the truth and loves the silent places;
A heart that is courageous and bears goodwill to all men.

The last line was later seen by some as sexist and the ending was changed to "and bears goodwill to all"

At the end of camps everyone will link hands and sing the closing song (which is an old Rote Falken song):

Link your hands together
A circle we make;
This bond of our friendship
No power can break.
Let's all sing together
In one mighty throng;
Should any be weary
We'll help them along;
Should any be weary
We'll help them along.

Let us then laugh lightly
If sadness should fall,
May joyous laughter
Spring from us all,
Helping each other
We'll lighten the load,
Arms linked with comrades
We travel the road.

Let us march together
With firm step and strong,
As out from the darkness
We all go along,
All sorrow is banished
We march to the light,
Link your hands together,
We're strong in our might.
PEACE

Until relatively recently the creed ended with a cry of 'How' rather than 'Peace'. This has been changed because the pseudo-Native American origin (with the patronising attitude implicit in its use) of the word 'How' does not match Woodcraft's policy of respect for other cultures.

Another alternative ending to group meetings involved the Folkmarshal and the Herald exchanging the following:

Folkmarshal:
Now the time has come when we must part and go our ways to our workshops and our desks.
May we remember the joys of kinship and look forward to our reunion.
Peace and Goodwill to all.
Herald! Proclaim ye the law.

Herald:
List, O Woodcraft Folk, for it is the Law of Fellowship I proclaim.
Learn to grow strong like the pine.
Keep yourself supple and clean,
Read the great book of nature, be hearty, happy and keen.
Work when there is work to be done, be helpful to all those in need,
Be faithful and true to your word, and pure in thought, word and deed.
I have spoken.

Folkmarshal:
Go ye your ways, and may the Spirit of Woodcraft Help you in all your works,
Be ye loyal to our cause and faithful to your fellow citizens.
Be strong! Live Kindly! Love the Sun and Follow The Trail!
I have spoken.

This would usually be followed by the campfire carol or other appropriate song.

Decision making
Woodcraft Folk is a democratic organisation. Policies are decided at annual conference (Annual Gathering), attended by delegates from groups and local districts. Between Annual Gathering responsibility for running the organisation falls on the members of the General Council. The organisation states that they "are proud of the fact that about half of our current General Council are young people under 25 years of age".

The District Fellows (DFs) also have an annual decision making meeting, known as "Althing". This is normally held in October. They have an elected committee where each post is held for two years. Any District Fellow is able to attend and vote on the motions. This is not to say that they are totally independent from the main body of Woodcraft Folk. District Fellows still have representatives at Annual Gathering, and decisions made there still apply.

Age groups
Woodcraft Folk groups operate in England, Scotland, Northern Ireland and Wales. In Wales the organisation is known as Gwerin y Coed. Groups generally meet weekly, their activities including co-operative games, drama, camping trips, craftwork, singing and dancing, as well as following an educational programme based on the organisation's aims and principles. Group nights last between one and two hours, depending on the age of the children or young people. Groups are divided by age.

Woodchips
Under six. The most recently established age group in Woodcraft Folk. Previously, under-sixes were known unofficially by several different names, including Pixies, Wood Pigeons and Mini-Elfins.

Elfins
Six to nine years old.

Pioneers
Ten to twelve years old.

Venturers
Thirteen to fifteen years old.

Venturer events are held nationally every three years as well as regional events happening more often such as midnight ice skating in London or North London Venturer Camp. A National Venturer Camp is held every three years so every Venturer can go once. Each camp has an overarching theme and runs activities for the Venturers to attend. The one held in 2010 at Biblins camp broke the three years regularity. This is because it would otherwise conflict with the coming International Camp in 2011. This enables Venturers who were thirteen during the camp in 2008 to attend Venturer Camp twice – once aged thirteen and once fifteen.

District Fellows

Sixteen- to twenty-year-olds are organised in a section called the District Fellows movement.

The District Fellows Movement (DFs) operates both on a local group level and as a semi-autonomous movement within Woodcraft Folk. The age group is largely run by DFs through the DF Committee. This organises three annual events, Winter Wonderland, Spring Awakening and DF Camp together with the AGM – Althing – and three regional, open committee meetings called Things. Other events celebrate music and fancy dress – such as "Span That World With Costume" and "Span That World with Music" – and members meet at regional events including beach bivvying and Valentines hostel weekends.

DFs have their own website, "Span That World". They also run their own campaigns. The last campaign was on Workers' Rights and Trade Unions.

Funding
Woodcraft Folk is paid for by weekly subscription from children and young people, adult memberships paid yearly and groups pay annual national registration fees. Woodcraft Folk has also from its start received substantial support from the co-operative movement and is part of Cooperatives UK

Woodcraft Folk used to receive a yearly subsidy from the Department for Education and Skills. In 2005, however, Woodcraft Folk lost this grant. The department said that the organisation's claim for a grant lacked detail and that they did not have "sufficiently robust outcome indicators", meaning that it did not represent a "good value for money", although some members of Woodcraft Folk have claimed that the real reason the funding was stopped is the group's strong stance against the Iraq War. This was the first time in forty years the organisation was denied funding by the department. The grant money provided a fifth of the funds that helped to pay for Woodcraft Folk's full-time staff and headquarters.

Woodcraft Folk campaigned to get its funding back and before the May 2005 election was offered a seconded employee from the Department for Education and Skills starting in 2006 for a year and a return to limited funding the year after.

Woodcraft Folk also receives sporadic funding from grant providers for project work it undertakes such as the London Training grant from the City Bridge Trust. Other recent grants include those for Global Village 2006 from the Department for International Development and the Cooperative Group and for the 18-month Climate Challenge project, C-Change, from the Department for Environment, Food and Rural Affairs.

Affiliations

International
Although a British organisation, it has sister organisations throughout the world, by being a part of the Brussels-based federation of progressive youth organisations, the International Falcon Movement - Socialist Education International (IFM-SEI).

The IFM-SEI links together like-minded progressive youth organisations in many parts of the world, though its strongest affiliates are in Western Europe and Latin America. It has a secretariat based in Brussels. Carly Walker-Dawson, a former Woodcraft Folk vice-chair is the (elected) secretary general. Woodcraft Folk's former general secretary Andy Piercy sat on the Control Commission of IFM-SEI until 2007.

International camps where similar organisations can meet up and network are held every year in different countries. International camps take place in England every four years or so.

Voluntary sector
Woodcraft Folk is affiliated to NCVO, National Council for Voluntary Organisations, and to the Scottish Council for Voluntary Organisations.

In the development education field, Woodcraft is an affiliate of the Development Education Association.

Youth service
The main youth 'quango' is the NYA, National Youth Agency, to which Woodcraft works closely. Woodcraft Folk plays an active part in the voluntary youth service, mainly through the NCVYS (pronounced‘nik-vis'), the National Council for Voluntary Youth Service, which also includes groups such as The Scout Association and Girlguiding UK.

Woodcraft Folk is affiliated to the British Youth Council, an umbrella body for youth councils and youth organisations across the UK.

Co-operative movement
Woodcraft Folk has since its founding had close links with the co-operative movement, and currently receives considerable financial support from various co-op bodies.

Co-operatives UK (formerly the Co-operative Union) is the federation of all co-operatives in the UK. Woodcraft Folk are members of Co-operatives UK and work closely with the Co-operative College.

Peace movement
Woodcraft Folk are members of the Stop the War Coalition and affiliated to the National Peace Council, the Campaign Against Arms Trade (CAAT) and work closely with many local CND branches.

Outdoor/environmental movements
Affiliations are held with the Ramblers Association (RA), and Woodcraft Folk have a close relationship with Youth Hostels Association (YHA) attending the AGM and other statutory meetings. Woodcraft Folk is affiliated to the Council for Environmental Education (CEE) and The Central Council of Physical Recreation (UK) (CCPR).

The Forest School Camps (FSC) organisation, which organises democratically run camps for children and young people, has very similar objectives to Woodcraft Folk with shared historical links which continue today.

General Secretaries and Chairs
Woodcraft Folk Democratic Years run from June to May and their financial, administrative years run from January to December. The last two General Secretaries have been appointed in January and unless stated the Chairs are all elected after the Annual Gathering some time between July and August.

Events
Woodcraft Folk organise both local and regional camps and activities as well as larger national camps such as a camp for Venturers (see above) held every three years and an International Camp, usually held every five to six years.

The second to last event, the Global Village Youth Festival of 2006, was the first in over 60 years to be held as an official IFM-SEI camp. Since then, another international festival has taken place. It was called CoCamp and concentrated on cooperation in the world. CoCamp was an unofficial IFM-SEI camp with groups from all over the world participating in the event.

Regional events are aimed at supporting local communities and traditions and reminding its members of the importance of holding onto ideals of justice, democracy, peace and co-operation. The South West Woodcraft Folk for instance meet annually at Levellers Day and the Tolpuddle Martyrs festival.

The Courier
The Courier was a seasonal members' magazine bringing news from inside Woodcraft Folk as well as worldwide news on events of interest to members of Woodcraft Folk.

See also
 District Fellows
 Sust'n'Able
 International Falcon Movement – Socialist Education International
 Woodcraft
 Woodcraft League of America
 Order of Woodcraft Chivalry
 Kibbo Kift
 Forest kindergarten
 Wandervogel

References

External links
 
 Global Village 2006 IFM-SEI festival
 District Fellows website
 Catalogue of the Youth Movement Archive at the Archives Division of the London School of Economics.
 District Fellows' wiki

 
Youth organisations based in the United Kingdom
Non-aligned Scouting organizations
Youth organizations established in 1925
Children's charities based in the United Kingdom
Scouting and Guiding in the United Kingdom
International Falcon Movement – Socialist Educational International
1925 establishments in the United Kingdom